James Shaw (1846–1910) was Mayor of Adelaide from 1888 to 1889.

James Shaw arrived in South Australia in 1864. Builder and contractor; Councillor for the Young Ward.

References
 
http://www.catalog.slsa.sa.gov.au/search~S1?/dShaw%2C+James%2C+1846-1910/dshaw+james+1846+1910/-3%2C-1%2C0%2CB/exact&FF=dshaw+james+1846+1910&1%2C21%2C
http://www.catalog.slsa.sa.gov.au/record=b2272210~S1, Obituary, Chronicle, 24 September 1910, p. 47, col. d

Mayors and Lord Mayors of Adelaide
19th-century Australian politicians
1846 births
1910 deaths